So Fresh: The Hits of Winter 2016 is a compilation album which has 22 tracks. The album was released on 17 June 2016.

Track listing

Charts

Weekly charts

Year-end charts

Certifications

References

2016 in Australian music
2016 compilation albums
So Fresh albums